The Hatta number (Ha) was developed by Shirôji Hatta, who taught at Tohoku University. It is a dimensionless parameter that compares the rate of reaction in a liquid film to the rate of diffusion through the film.

It is an important parameter used in Chemical Reaction Engineering.

References

See also 
Dimensionless quantity
Dimensional analysis

Catalysis
Dimensionless numbers of chemistry
Transport phenomena